Root zone may refer to:

 roots, of plants
 rhizosphere, of plants
 DNS root zone, the start of the Domain Name System